George Savary Wasson (1855 – April 28, 1932) was an American novelist, painter and boat builder.

Wasson was born in Groveland, Massachusetts on August 27, 1855. His father was David Atwood Wasson, a Transcendentalist pastor. He settled in Kittery Point, Maine in 1889, where he built a house. He had two sons, David Arnold (1887-1915) and Lewis Talcott (1889-1912). In 1916, Wasson moved to Bangor.

Wasson wrote novels, which he illustrated. His novels captured the New England dialect used in southern Maine at the turn of the century.

Works
Cap’n Simeon’s Store (1903)
The Green Shay (1905)
Home from Sea (1908)
Sailing Days on the Penobscot (1932)

References

1855 births
1932 deaths
20th-century American novelists
American male novelists
19th-century American painters
19th-century American male artists
American male painters
20th-century American painters
People from Groveland, Massachusetts
People from Kittery, Maine
Writers from Bangor, Maine
Novelists from Massachusetts
Painters from Massachusetts
Painters from Maine
Artists from Bangor, Maine
20th-century American male writers
Novelists from Maine
20th-century American male artists